Boriss Monjaks (born 11 April 1970) is a former football defender from Latvia. He obtained a total number of 16 caps for the Latvia national team between 1992 and 2001, scoring no goal. His last club was Daugava Rīga, where he retired in 2002.

Honours
 Baltic Cup
 1993

References
 

1970 births
Living people
Latvian footballers
Association football defenders
Latvia international footballers
Latvian expatriate footballers
Daugava Rīga players